Dennis Packard (born February 9, 1982) is a Canadian-American former professional ice hockey player, who last played for the HC Bílí Tygři Liberec of the Czech Extraliga.

Early life
Although born in Canada, he grew up in Kingston, Pennsylvania, where he attended high school and began his ice hockey career at Wyoming Seminary, and has dual-citizenship. Packard is the son of Dr. H. Jeremy Packard, who served as President of Wyoming Seminary from 1990–2007, and Ingrid Cronin.

Playing career
During his high-school years Packard played for the Wyoming Seminary Blue Knights, a national prep school program.  In his senior year, he was selected to the US Junior National Team in 1999-2000, and spent the fall and winter with the National Team Development program in Michigan. When playing for the Harvard University hockey team and pursuing an undergraduate degree, Packard was drafted by Tampa Bay Lightning in round 7 of the 2001 NHL Entry Draft. Between 2004 and 2006 he played for the Springfield Falcons in the AHL as well as for the Johnstown Chiefs in the ECHL. In 2006, he signed as an unrestricted free agent with the Boston Bruins. He played a season with the Providence Bruins, then moved to the San Jose Sharks organization, playing with their AHL affiliate in Worcester. Most recently, Packard joined the Bridgeport Sound Tigers, the AHL affiliate of the New York Islanders.

Post-playing career
Dennis is currently attending Columbia Business School.

Career statistics

Regular season and playoffs

International

External links

Hockey's Future - Higher Education
 PlanGuru - Business budgeting, forecasting, and planning software

1982 births
American men's ice hockey left wingers
Canadian emigrants to the United States
Canadian ice hockey left wingers
Harvard Crimson men's ice hockey players
Ice hockey people from Ontario
Ice hockey players from Pennsylvania
Johnstown Chiefs players
Living people
People from Kingston, Pennsylvania
Providence Bruins players
Sportspeople from St. Catharines
Springfield Falcons players
Tampa Bay Lightning draft picks
Worcester Sharks players
Canadian expatriate ice hockey players in the United States